Ron Adair (born 1931 in Derry, Northern Ireland) is an Australian former association footballer.

Playing career

Club career
Adair played his junior football for Victoria Park in Western Australia before joining North Perth in 1952. After playing two season for North Perth he joined Maccabeans for a season before transferring to Azzurri. In 1956 Adair played for North Shore in New South Wales before returning to WA to play for Swan Athletic.

State career
Adair played 23 times for Western Australia, captaining the state 11 times.

International career
Adair played three full international matches for the Australia national association football team between 1954 and 1958, scoring one goal. Adair captained Australia in two B-internationals - against Rapid Vienna in 1955 and Heart of Midlothian in 1959.

Honours

Individual
 Football Federation Australia - Football Hall of Fame Inductee: 1999
 Western Australian State League Best and Fairest: 1953, 1954, 1955
 Football Hall of Fame Western Australia Inductee: 2005

References

1931 births
Australian soccer players
Australia international soccer players
Sportspeople from Derry (city)
Living people
Northern Ireland emigrants to Australia
Association football defenders